Selvasaura evasa, the elusive microtegu, occurs in Peru.

References
  

Selvasaura
Reptiles described in 2021